The Battle of Grahovac took place in the eponymous village of Grahovac from 11 to 13 May 1858, when the Montenegrin Grand Duke Mirko Petrović-Njegoš led the army of Principality of Montenegro against the Ottomans, ending in a decisive Montenegrin victory. After the victory, the demarcation of the border between Montenegro and the Ottoman Bosnia Eyalet was finalised. A considerable arsenal of war trophies was captured following the retreat of the Ottoman army.

Background 

On 10 May 1858, the Ottoman commander Hussein Pasha captured the villages of Vilusi and Grahovo and continued his advance towards Grahovac, a small village located on a plateau elevated slightly above the captured area. The core of Montenegrin resistance was in Grahovac, which was the main bastion of Montenegrin defence according to military plans.

Battle 

The fighting itself started on May 11, early in the morning. The Ottomans attacked Grahovac while Montenegrins were stubbornly defending, determined not to retreat at any cost. Most of 3,000 Ottoman and 1,000 Montenegrin casualties were made on that day. On May 12, Hussein Pasha offered a truce to Montenegrin commander-in-chief Grand Duke Mirko Petrović-Njegoš, but he refused it, although he did allow the Ottomans time to bury their dead. He also refused to send men to disrupt the Ottomans supply of water. Although this would have given him a tactical advantage, he considered it a dishonourable move.

On May 13, the decisive battle started as the Ottomans got military support from Bosnia. But this time, the Montenegrins took charge and attacked the Ottomans, forcing them into successive retreats. The biggest problem for the Montenegrins was a well-armed Ottoman artillery, which was constantly bombarding their positions with cannons. Eventually, the Montenegrins decided to charge across the battlefield and take over the cannons. After they saw two of the commanders, the Serdar (Count) Đuro Kusovac and the priest Luka Jovović, being killed while charging, the rest of the Montenegrin troops, including the guardsmen, began a rapid advance with a shout: "Forward, to avenge our commanders". The offensive was successful, and by capturing Ottoman cannons, the Montenegrins had officially won the battle.

Aftermath
This major victory had had even more diplomatic significance. The glory of Montenegrin weapons was soon immortalised in the songs and literature of all the South Slavs, in particular the Serbs in Vojvodina, then part of Austria-Hungary. This Montenegrin victory forced the Great Powers to officially demarcate the borders between Montenegro and Ottoman Empire, de facto recognizing Montenegro's centuries-long independence. Montenegro gained Grahovo, Rudine, Nikšići, more than half of Drobnjaci, Tušina, Uskoci, Lipovo, Upper Vasojevići, and part of Kuči and Dodoši.

Prince Danilo granted all of the battle survivors the "Grahovo medal", and Mirko Petrović-Njegoš was proclaimed "Grand Duke of Grahovo". In 1864 King Nicholas I built the Church of the Ascension on the site of Hussein Pasha's headquarters, and in 2008, the Montenegrin government revealed an obelisk which honours the battle and its participants. Both on the church and the obelisk read the famous quotation from Petar II Petrović-Njegoš's The Mountain Wreath: The monument to your bravery is Montenegro and its freedom.

Gallery

References

Sources

Grahovac
Grahovac
Grahovac
Grahovac
Ottoman period in the history of Montenegro
Principality of Montenegro
May 1858 events